Princess Royal Drive is a road that follows the northern shore of Princess Royal Harbour in Albany, Western Australia.

It is the harbour side end of York Street and runs parallel to Stirling Terrace for part of its route.

It has a walkway pass over it from Stirling Terrace across to the Albany waterfront.

It goes on the land side of the ANZAC Peace Park. It also runs south of the Albany railway station, closer to the harbour.

It commences at a junction with Frenchmans Bay Road at its western end, and continues as far a junction with Brunswick Road below Mount Adelaide, which is in the eastern end of the Mount Clarence parklands.

The Port of Albany is situated along Princess Royal Drive, resulting in many heavy haulage trucks using to the road to access the port area and the adjacent Cooperative Bulk Handling facilities at the Westrail terminus.
Princess Royal Seafoods, a processing plant for pilchards, salmon and patagonian toothfish, is found along the road to the west of the port.

References

Princess Royal Harbour
Streets in Albany, Western Australia